Wintergreen Cemetery is a historic cemetery in Port Gibson, Mississippi. It was added to the National Register of Historic Places on July 22, 1979. It is located at East Greenwood Street.

Notable burials
 Samuel Reading Bertron (1865–1938), banker
 Benjamin G. Humphreys (1808–1882), Civil War general
 James G. Spencer (1844–1926), US Representative
 Earl Van Dorn (1820–1863), Civil War general
 Peter Aaron Van Dorn (1773–1837) lawyer and plantation owner, father of Earl, above.

See also
 National Register of Historic Places listings in Claiborne County, Mississippi

References

External links
 
 

Cemeteries on the National Register of Historic Places in Mississippi
Protected areas of Claiborne County, Mississippi
National Register of Historic Places in Claiborne County, Mississippi